Boheman Bird Sanctuary is a bird reserve in Svalbard, Norway, established in 1973. It includes islands south of Bohemanflya in Oscar II Land. The protected area covers a total of 2,076,000 square metres.

References

Bird sanctuaries in Svalbard
Protected areas established in 1973
1973 establishments in Norway